Aşağıçayır  is a village in Zonguldak District. Zonguldak Province, Turkey.

References

Villages in Zonguldak Central District